Sunlight is an unincorporated community in Greenbrier County, West Virginia, United States.

The community was named after the brand of shoes sold in the town store.

References

Unincorporated communities in Greenbrier County, West Virginia
Unincorporated communities in West Virginia